Hothouse Creek is a stream in the U.S. states of Georgia and North Carolina. It is a tributary to the Toccoa/Ocoee River.

Hothouse Creek was named for Cherokee sweat lodges in the area. An alternative spelling is "Hot House Creek".

References

Rivers of Georgia (U.S. state)
Rivers of Fannin County, Georgia
Rivers of North Carolina
Rivers of Cherokee County, North Carolina